Jones Farm may refer to:

Jones Farm (Sanger, Texas), listed on the National Register of Historic Places in Denton County, Texas
Jones Farm (Kenbridge, Virginia), listed on the National Register of Historic Places in Lunenburg County

See also
Jones House (disambiguation)